The 2018 Antalya Open (also known as the Turkish Airlines Open Antalya for sponsorship reasons) was a men's tennis tournament played on grass courts. It was the 2nd edition of the event, and part of the ATP World Tour 250 series of the 2018 ATP World Tour. It took place at the Kaya Palazzo Resort in Belek, Antalya Province, Turkey, from June 24–30.

Singles main-draw entrants

Seeds

 Rankings are as of June 11, 2018.

Other entrants
The following players received wildcards into the singles main draw:
  Cem İlkel
  Gaël Monfils
  Fernando Verdasco

The following players received entry from the qualifying draw:
  Taro Daniel
  Filip Horanský 
  Blaž Kavčič 
  Mikhail Youzhny

Withdrawals
Before the tournament
  Pablo Cuevas → replaced by  Jordan Thompson
  Lu Yen-hsun → replaced by  Mirza Bašić
  Maximilian Marterer → replaced by  Marcos Baghdatis
  Vasek Pospisil → replaced by  Ričardas Berankis

Doubles main-draw entrants

Seeds

 Rankings are as of June 18, 2018.

Other entrants
The following pairs received wildcards into the doubles main draw:
  Tuna Altuna /  Konstantin Kravchuk
  Koray Kırcı /  Ergi Kırkın

Champions

Singles 

  Damir Džumhur def.  Adrian Mannarino, 6–1, 1–6, 6–1

Doubles 

  Marcelo Demoliner /  Santiago González def.  Sander Arends /  Matwé Middelkoop, 7–5, 6–7(6–8), [10–8]

References

External links 
Official website 

Antalya Open
Antalya Open
Antalya Open
Antalya Open